Foreverlution is the second studio album by Australian hip hop group Thundamentals. It was released through Obese Records on 29 July 2011 and peaked at number 64 on the ARIA albums chart.

Track listing

Charts

References

2011 albums
Thundamentals albums